Blapstinus is a genus of darkling beetles in the family Tenebrionidae. There are more than 100 described species in Blapstinus.

See also
 List of Blapstinus species

References

Further reading

External links

 

Tenebrioninae
Articles created by Qbugbot